An undervote occurs when the number of distinct choices selected by a voter in a contest is less than the minimum number allowed for that contest or when no selection is made for a single choice contest.

In a contested election, an undervote can be construed as active voter disaffection: a voter engaged enough to cast a vote without the willingness to give the vote to any candidate. An undervote can be intentional for purposes including protest votes, tactical voting, or abstention. Alternately undervotes can be unintentional and caused by many factors including poor ballot design. Undervotes caused by voting for a single candidate in multiple positions is usually caused by a voter's misunderstanding of the mechanics of the preference ballot.

Undervotes combined with overvotes (known as residual votes) can be an academic indicator in evaluating the accuracy of a voting system when recording voter intent.

References

External links 
 Champaign County Illinois November 2006 Undervote Analysis
 Caltech/ MIT Voting Technology Project

Elections
Voting theory